"Day Tripper" is a song by the English rock band the Beatles that was released as a double A-side single with "We Can Work It Out" in December 1965. The song was written primarily by John Lennon with some contributions from Paul McCartney and was credited to the Lennon–McCartney partnership. Both songs were recorded during the sessions for the band's Rubber Soul album. The single topped charts in Britain, Ireland, the Netherlands and Norway. In the United States, "Day Tripper" peaked at number five on the Billboard Hot 100 chart and "We Can Work It Out" held the top position.

"Day Tripper" is a rock song based around an electric guitar riff and drawing on the influence of American soul music. The Beatles included it in their concert set-list until their retirement from live performances in late August 1966. The single was the first example of a double A-side in Britain. Its success popularised the format and, in giving equal treatment to two songs, allowed recording artists to show their versatility. The band's use of promotional films to market the single anticipated the modern music video.

In the UK, "Day Tripper" / "We Can Work It Out" was the seventh highest selling single of the 1960s. As of December 2018, it was the 54th best-selling single of all time in the UK – one of six Beatles singles included in the top sales rankings published by the Official Charts Company.

Background and inspiration
"Day Tripper" was written early in the Rubber Soul sessions when the Beatles were under pressure to produce a new single for the Christmas market. John Lennon wrote the music and most of the lyrics, while Paul McCartney contributed some of the lyrics. Lennon based the song's guitar riff on that from Bobby Parker's "Watch Your Step", which had also been his model for "I Feel Fine" in 1964. In a 1980 interview, Lennon said of "Day Tripper": "That's mine. Including the lick, the guitar break and the whole bit." In the 1997 book Many Years from Now, McCartney claims that it was a collaboration but Lennon deserved "the main credit".

Lennon described "Day Tripper" as a "drug song" in 1970, and in a 2004 interview McCartney said it was "about acid" (LSD). The song title is a play on words referring to both a tourist on a day-trip and a "trip" in the sense of a psychedelic experience. Lennon recalled: "Day trippers are people who go on a day trip, right? Usually on a ferryboat or something. But [the song] was kind of ... 'you're just a weekend hippie.' Get it?" In Many Years from Now, McCartney says that "Day Tripper" was about sex and drugs; he describes it as "a tongue-in-cheek song about someone who was ... committed only in part to the idea. Whereas we saw ourselves as full-time trippers ..."

During the sessions for Rubber Soul, a rift was growing between McCartney and his bandmates as he continued to abstain from taking LSD. After Lennon and George Harrison had first taken the drug in London early in 1965, Ringo Starr had joined them for their second experience, which took place in Los Angeles when the Beatles stopped there during their August 1965 US tour. Given McCartney's continued abstinence, author Ian MacDonald says that the song's lyric may well have been partly directed at him, as does music journalist Keith Cameron.

When writing and recording their new songs, the Beatles drew on their experiences from the recent US tour. Throughout the summer, soul music had been one of the dominant sounds heard on American radio, particularly singles by acts signed to the Motown and Stax record labels. Author Jon Savage writes that in the British pop scene of late 1965, American soul music was "everywhere", and the Beatles readily embraced the genre in both "Day Tripper" and the Rubber Soul track "Drive My Car". According to MacDonald, Lennon possibly came up with the riff in an effort to improve on the Rolling Stones' 1965 hit single "(I Can't Get No) Satisfaction", which similarly showed the influence of Stax soul.

Composition

Guitar riff

The main compositional feature of "Day Tripper" is its two-bar, single-chord guitar riff. The riff opens and closes the song, and forms the basis of the verses. In addition, the pattern is transposed to the IV chord during the verses and to the V chord for the bridge.

In musicologist Alan Pollack's description:
[The] riff has both the overall shape of a non-symmetrical rising arch whose descent does not completely balance out its ascent, yet it makes an impression of upward bound saw-tooth angularity; note particularly the way it drops a full octave in the space of a single eighth note whenever it repeats. Harmonically it outlines a bluesy I9 chord (with the flat seventh!). Rhythmically, it places hard syncopations on the eighth note preceding both the first and third beat of the second measure, while its final three eighth notes provide momentum that effectively leads into the repeat.

Musicologist Walter Everett highlights the riff as an example of the Beatles drawing inspiration from other artists and improving on the source material. He sees the "Day Tripper" riff as a combination of the ostinatos heard on Motown recordings such as the Temptations' "My Girl", Barrett Strong's "Money (That's What I Want)" and Marvin Gaye's "I'll Be Doggone", while also incorporating a rockabilly element that recalls Roy Orbison's "Oh, Pretty Woman".

Musical structure
The song is in 4/4 time throughout and the home key is E major. It opens with the riff played in unison on lead and rhythm guitar, followed by a staggered entrance of bass guitar, tambourine and finally drums. After this extended intro, the song's structure comprises two verses, a bridge that serves as an instrumental break, then a final verse, and the outro.

The verse adheres to the twelve-bar blues form for eight bars, with a change to the IV chord followed by the expected return to I. The chorus portion of the verse then departs from the form by moving to the parallel major version of the home key's relative minor. As throughout the song, only major chords are used in this portion: F7 for four bars, and one bar each of A7, G7, C7 and B7.

The bridge remains on the B chord for its entirety and takes the form of a "rave-up". The section begins with repetitions of the main riff and ends with a blues-inflected guitar solo accompanied by wordless harmony singing. A 12-note rising guitar scale sounds on the second beat of each bar, starting with a mid-range B note and climbing over an octave to F. In Everett's view, the intensity of the bridge – the bass pedal, rising scale, guitar solos, cymbal playing, and increased attack on the vocalised "aah"s – conveys the realisation that the singer is being used by the female day-tripper and "express a gradually-arising, yet sudden sensation of, enlightenment".

Vocal line and lyrics
"Day Tripper" follows a strand of Lennon's writing style in which the lyrics put down a woman who claims to be more than what she delivers, a theme commonly found in rhythm and blues and blues songs. In the description of music critic Tim Riley, the song is about "being awakened and jilted all at once", as best conveyed in the singer's declaration that "It took me so long to find out". The line "She's a big teaser" was a code for "She's a prick teaser."

The vocal line over the verses contrasts with the flowing and circular quality of the main riff by including downward and abrupt phrasing. Pollack cites this aspect as an example of the composition's manipulation of harmonic rhythm. He also highlights the judicious use of falsetto and change of wording in the final chorus – where the day tripper's "one-way ticket" becomes a reference to her as a "Sunday driver" – as examples of the song's avoidance of "rote consistency" and its ability to continually surprise. In music journalist Paul Du Noyer's view, the song reveals "multiple layers in play". He cites "the triple implication of 'day tripper' as flighty girlfriend, or weekend hop-head, or uncommitted disciple of the new wisdom", adding that the ascending wordless vocalisation in the bridge serves as a "self-reference to that defining Beatle moment" in their 1963 cover of "Twist and Shout".

Recording
The Beatles recorded the song at their first session after completing "Drive My Car". The session took place at EMI Studios (now Abbey Road Studios) in London on 16 October 1965. Unusually for the time, the group allowed visitors into the studio, as Lennon's wife Cynthia and his half-sisters Julia Baird and Jacqui Dykins attended part of the session. The band rehearsed the song for much of the afternoon before taping the basic track. The line-up was Lennon and Harrison on rhythm and lead guitar, respectively, McCartney on bass and Starr on drums.

Take 3 was selected for overdubs, having been the only take in which the performance did not break down. On the studio tapes from the session, Starr can be heard encouraging his bandmates to "really rock it this time" before take 1. MacDonald describes Starr's drumming over the choruses as "another in-joke", further to the Beatles' channelling of the Stax sound on "Drive My Car", as his reversion to fours on the bass drum recalls Al Jackson's playing with Booker T. & the M.G.'s.

Lennon and McCartney overdubbed lead vocals, with McCartney the more prominent singer in the verses' first and third lines, and Harrison added a harmony vocal over the choruses and the instrumental bridge. Starr overdubbed the tambourine.

Music journalist Rob Chapman views the guitar interplay on "Day Tripper" as an example of the Beatles' "baroque sonata" approach to musical arrangements. Harrison played the bridge's rising scale using a guitar volume-pedal effect, and overdubbed a second lead guitar part over the same section. Everett, Riley and authors Jean-Michel Guesdon and Philippe Margotin say that Harrison played the blues solo, while MacDonald credits Lennon. After completing the song late that evening, the band recorded the basic track for "If I Needed Someone" in a single take.

A-side status and promotional clips
"Day Tripper" had been conceived as the A-side of the Beatles' next single but the band came to favour "We Can Work It Out", which was predominantly written by McCartney and recorded later in the Rubber Soul sessions. Lennon continued to argue for "Day Tripper". To promote the upcoming release, the Beatles filmed mimed performances of the two songs on 1–2 November for inclusion in the Granada TV special The Music of Lennon & McCartney. At the start of "Day Tripper", the band were accompanied by a group of go-go dancers.

On 15 November, EMI announced that the A-side would be "We Can Work It Out", only for Lennon to publicly contradict this two days later. As a compromise, the single was marketed as a double A-side, the first of its kind in the UK. Lennon's championing of "Day Tripper" was based on his belief that the Beatles' rock sound should be favoured over the softer style of "We Can Work It Out".

Further to the Granada filming, the Beatles decided to promote the single solely through pre-recorded film clips for the first time. On 23 November, they filmed three black-and-white promotional clips for each of the songs at Twickenham Film Studios in south-west London. The clips were designed to be sent to various television music and variety shows around the world, to air on those programmes in lieu of personal studio appearances. Directed by Joe McGrath and later known collectively as the "Intertel Promos", the filming also included mimed performances of "I Feel Fine", "Ticket to Ride" and "Help!" for inclusion in Top of the Pops round-up of the biggest hits of 1965.

As with the other clips, the promos for "Day Tripper" showed the Beatles making minimal effort to appear as though they were performing the song. In the first clip, the band members are dressed in black and perform on a stage in front of shiny pillars. Following the song's bridge, Starr marches rather than plays, seated at his drum kit.

For the second promo, they wore their military-style jackets from their August 1965 concert at New York's Shea Stadium. Surrounded by travel-themed props, they perform in front of a backdrop of tinsel and a New Year's greeting in French. Lennon and McCartney stand behind an aeroplane, while Harrison and Starr play through the windows of a railway carriage. With no drum kit visible, Starr discards his drumsticks in favour of a saw and begins sawing through the carriage. In music critic Richie Unterberger's view, Starr's antics lend the performance "a dash of surrealism (by 1965 pop group standards at any rate)".

Release and reception
The single was released on EMI's Parlophone label in Britain (as Parlophone R 5389) on 3 December 1965, the same day as Rubber Soul. On the front page of its issue published the previous day, Melody Maker confirmed the release dates as well as the dates for the promos' airing on British TV and for the band's UK tour; the editors called the week ahead "National Beatles Week". In the United States, Capitol Records issued the single on 6 December (as Capitol 5555).

The release coincided with speculation in the UK press that the Beatles' superiority in the pop world since 1963 might be coming to an end, given the customary two or three years that most acts could expect to remain at the peak of their popularity. In addition, after receiving their MBEs for services to the national economy in October, the group were temporarily perceived as being part of the establishment. Cash Boxs reviewer predicted that the Beatles would "quickly trip the [US] charts fantastic for the umpteenth time" with "We Can Work It Out" and described "Day Tripper" as a "hard-pounding, raunchy ode all about a gal who is somewhat of a tease". Derek Johnson of the NME said that "Day Tripper" "generates plenty of excitement" but it was "not one of the boys' strongest melodically", and "the other side is much more startling in conception." In his role as guest reviewer for Melody Maker, the Animals' Eric Burdon said he preferred "Day Tripper" and especially admired Harrison's guitar contributions, saying that rather than musical prowess, "It's what he does and when he does it." Burdon also wrote: "It's fantastic that every Beatles record that comes out gets knocked, then two or three days after everybody likes it. But I like this immediately."

"Day Tripper" / "We Can Work It Out" entered the UK Singles Chart (at the time, the Record Retailer chart) on 15 December, at number 2, before holding the top position for five consecutive weeks. The single also failed to top the national chart published by Melody Maker in its first week – marking the first occasion since December 1963 that a new Beatles single had not immediately entered at number 1. Although it was an immediate number 1 on the NMEs chart, the Daily Mirror and Daily Express newspapers both published articles highlighting the apparent decline.

The record was the Beatles' ninth consecutive chart-topping single in Record Retailer and their tenth on the country's other charts, and for the third year in succession they had the Christmas number 1 hit as well as the top-selling album. "Day Tripper" / "We Can Work It Out" was also the band's fastest-selling single in the UK since "Can't Buy Me Love" in 1964. Alan Smith, the reporter assigned to cover the Beatles' UK tour for the NME, commented: "Anyone who says they're finished – particularly with 'Day Tripper' / 'We Can Work It Out' at No. 1 in the NME Chart in its first week – must be out of his head!"

In the US, both songs entered the Billboard Hot 100 on the week ending 18 December. In early 1966, "We Can Work It Out" spent three non-consecutive weeks at number 1, while "Day Tripper" peaked at number 5. The single was certified gold by the Recording Industry Association of America, for sales of 1 million or over, on 6 January. The record topped charts in many other countries around the world, although "We Can Work It Out" was usually the favoured side.

Live performances
The Beatles included "Day Tripper" in the set list for their December 1965 UK tour. They continued to perform it live throughout 1966. When they played it at Cleveland's Municipal Stadium on 14 August, the song triggered a crowd invasion that some commentators likened to the race riots that had recently taken place in the east of Cleveland. Over 2,000 fans broke through the security barriers separating the audience from the open area housing the elevated stage, causing the Beatles to stop the performance and shelter backstage for half an hour until order was restored. The song prompted a similar response when the group returned to Shea Stadium on 23 August.

During the band's final press conference as a performing act, held at the Capitol Tower in Los Angeles on 28 August, a reporter asked what they thought of Time magazine's recent dismissal of pop music, particularly the writers' contention that "Day Tripper" was about a prostitute and "Norwegian Wood" was a song about a lesbian. McCartney joked that "We were just trying to write songs about prostitutes and lesbians, that's all." When introducing the song at San Francisco's Candlestick Park the following night, during the Beatles' final commercial concert, Lennon described it as being "about the very naughty lady called Day Tripper".

McCartney included the song in his tour set list from 2009 to 2012. A live version appears on his 2009 live album Good Evening New York City.

Subsequent releases and mixes
In June 1966, "Day Tripper" was included on Yesterday and Today, an album configured by Capitol for the North American market. In November that year, a new stereo mix was created for the EMI compilation A Collection of Beatles Oldies. "Day Tripper" later appeared on the band's 1962–1966 compilation, released in 1973. CD versions of that album used the November 1966 remix, as did the Past Masters, Volume Two compilation, released in 1988.

Whereas in the 1965 stereo mix, one of the guitars is inaudible for the first couple of seconds of the intro, the remix has both guitars entering from the start. The 1966 stereo mix also adds extra reverb on the vocals and edits out a stray "yeah" from Lennon at the start of the coda. Both of these stereo mixes contain some engineering errors. Drop-outs occur in the track containing lead guitar and tambourine early in the third verse (after the line "Tried to please her") and in the coda. Riley comments on the significance of the first error, saying that "technical flaws are so rare on a Beatles recording that its inclusion is strange." The drop-outs were fixed for the release of the 2000 compilation 1, by copying the required sounds from another point in the song.

One of the November 1965 promotional clips was included in the Beatles' 2015 video compilation 1, and two appear in the three-disc versions of the compilation, titled 1+. The mimed performance from The Music of Lennon & McCartney was also included on 1+.

Impact and legacy
The success of "Day Tripper" / "We Can Work It Out" popularised the double A-side format and, in giving equal treatment to two songs, allowed recording artists to show their versatility. The Beatles' decision to send out independently produced films to promote their music anticipated the modern music video and the rise of MTV in the 1980s. According to music journalist Robert Fontenot, "Since these performances [of 'Day Tripper' and 'We Can Work It Out'] were not filmed in front of an audience, they can be considered the world's first music videos as we understand the format today."

According to author and musician John Kruth, the guitar riff on "Day Tripper" was a part that every young guitarist in the UK and the US "had to learn". Lenny Kaye, an aspiring musician in 1965, later described it as one of the era's "great riffs" and highlighted the song as an example of how the Beatles' music was always harder to master than that of contemporaries such as the Rolling Stones and the Yardbirds. The song's use of an octave-doubled guitar riff anticipated a characteristic of Cream and Led Zeppelin later in the 1960s, particularly in their respective songs "Sunshine of Your Love" and "Good Times Bad Times" and "Heartbreaker". Lennon said that McCartney's riff-driven "Paperback Writer", the A-side of the Beatles' May 1966 single, was "son of 'Day Tripper'".

Although Lennon expressed dissatisfaction with the song, it has remained popular with critics and fans. Dave Marsh described "Day Tripper" as the most authentic approximation of a genuine soul recording the Beatles had yet made. Tim Riley deems it "Lennon's guitar heaven", with a mid-song "rave-up to end all rave-ups" and a "brilliant yet coolly irreverent" riff. He also admires Starr's drumming, particularly over the coda, saying that it serves as one of "Ringo's finest moments" on record. Less impressed, Ian MacDonald says the track suggests that wit in the form of musical jokes had become the band's "new gimmick". He considers it to be "Musically uninspired by The Beatles' standards" and ruined by the engineering error in the third verse. Alex Petridis of The Guardian finds the song inferior to "We Can Work It Out", writing: "Its addictive riff aside, there is something unappealingly snooty about Day Tripper: the sound of an acid initiate sneering at someone insufficiently hip to have turned on, tuned in and dropped out."

"Day Tripper" / "We Can Work It Out" was one of the "Treasure Island" singles listed in Greil Marcus's 1979 book Stranded. It was also included in Marsh's 1989 book The 1001 Greatest Singles Ever Made, ranked at number 382, and in Paul Williams' 1993 book Rock and Roll: The 100 Best Singles of All Time. The NME ranked it at number 25 in the magazine's list of "The Top 100 Singles of All Time" in 1976, and Mojo ranked it 62nd in a similar list compiled in 1997.

In 2010, Rolling Stone ranked "Day Tripper" 39th in its list of "The 100 Greatest Beatles Songs". In Mojos list, published in 2006, the track appeared at number 74, a ranking that Keith Cameron bemoaned as too low in his commentary for the magazine. He said it was the most riff-oriented of all the Beatles' songs and praised the group's performance, highlighting Lennon and McCartney's "finest tag vocal melodrama", Starr's effective drum rolls, and Harrison's ascending sequence over the middle eight for "lur[ing] us to the verge of hysteria". "Day Tripper" was ranked the 30th best Beatles song by Ultimate Classic Rock in 2014 and by the music staff of Time Out London in 2017.

By November 2012, the single had sold 1.39 million copies in the UK, making it the group's fifth million-seller in that country. As of December 2018, the double A-side was the 54th best-selling single of all time in the UK – one of six Beatles entries in the top sales rankings published by the Official Charts Company.

Cover versions and musical references

In 1966, the song was covered by Otis Redding, whose version peaked at number 43 on the Record Retailer chart in 1967. According to MacDonald, Redding was delighted by the Beatles' imitation of his sound in "Drive My Car" and responded by recording "his own, madly up-tempo" arrangement of "Day Tripper". Jon Savage cites Redding's covers of "Day Tripper" and the Rolling Stones' "(I Can't Get No) Satisfaction" as part of a trend by Stax artists and other African-American soul musicians that acknowledged the Beatles, the Rolling Stones and Bob Dylan but was "also an assertion of pop equality – 'We're just as good as you.'" Having backed Redding on his cover, as the Stax house band, Booker T. & the M.G.'s also recorded the song for the label.

Kruth highlights Mae West's 1966 version, on Way Out West, for its sexual suggestiveness as she transposes the lyrics into a first-person perspective, singing "I'm a big teaser / I took him half the way there", and includes a "sizzling striptease groove" in the musical backing. According to Kruth, Nancy Sinatra provided another "hot" female reading on her album Boots, which also includes a provocative interpretation of "Run for Your Life", Lennon's "sexist 'sermon'" from Rubber Soul. Richie Unterberger pairs Jimi Hendrix with Redding as the major artists who realised "the inherent soulfulness of 'Day Tripper'" in their cover recordings. Described by Kruth as "red-hot", Hendrix's version was recorded for BBC Radio in 1967 and subsequently issued on his 1998 album BBC Sessions.

Lennon was indifferent about Redding's version; in his 1968 Rolling Stone review, Lennon said he especially liked José Feliciano's recording of the song. "Day Tripper" was the lead track on the Irish band Beethoven's 1989 Him Goolie Goolie Man, Dem EP. Steven Wells of the NME named the record "Single of the Week", writing that "The centrestone of this jewel of a record is the kidnapping, tarring and feathering, mugging, shagging and destruction of 'Day Tripper'."

Pauline Oliveros's tape-delay collage piece "Rock Symphony", which she debuted at the San Francisco Tape Music Center in December 1965, used samples of "Day Tripper" and "Norwegian Wood", along with recent recordings by the Animals, the Bobby Fuller Four and Tammi Terrell. Rob Chapman cites the Oliveros composition as an example of mid-1960s avant-garde composers being quick to incorporate the latest pop sounds into their work, thereby expanding the scope of their medium.

Eric Clapton included the riff from "Day Tripper" in the song "What'd I Say" on the 1966 album Blues Breakers with Eric Clapton. That same year, Buffalo Springfield included the riff in "Baby Don't Scold Me", a track available on the original pressing of the band's debut album, Buffalo Springfield. Yes used it in the introduction to their 1969 cover of the Beatles' "Every Little Thing". April Wine also used the riff, along with that of the Stones' "Satisfaction", at the end of their 1979 song "I Like to Rock".

Personnel
According to Ian MacDonald:

John Lennon – double-tracked lead vocal, rhythm/lead guitar
Paul McCartney – double-tracked lead vocal, bass guitar
George Harrison – lead guitar, harmony vocal
Ringo Starr – drums, tambourine

Charts

Certifications

Notes

References

Sources

External links
Full lyrics for the song at the Beatles' official website

1965 singles
1965 songs
The Beatles songs
Parlophone singles
Capitol Records singles
Songs written by Lennon–McCartney
Song recordings produced by George Martin
Songs published by Northern Songs
UK Singles Chart number-one singles
Christmas number-one singles in the United Kingdom
Songs about drugs
Nancy Sinatra songs